Fracture is the second studio album by Leeds Jazz-Rock ensemble Roller Trio following the success of their Mercury Prize nominated debut album Roller Trio. It was released in 2014 and in The Guardian John Fordham said [Roller Trio] "have come up with a second album that’s different and diverse, and on a live show it must be a gas".  London Jazz News said "This is a marker laid down by a group operating at the vanguard of contemporary jazz." The album received 4 stars in All About Jazz where the reviewer Phil Barnes said, "This ability to blend the accessible and the serious, the melodic and the experimental is a real gift".

Track listing

Personnel
Roller Trio
 James Mainwaring– saxophone, effects
 Luke Wynter – guitar, FX, bass
 Luke Reddin-Williams – drums

Production
 Sam Hobbs – recording, engineering, production

References

External links

 

2014 albums
Roller Trio albums